Natsumi Fujita (藤田 夏未 Fujita Natsumi, born August 5, 1991) is a Japanese volleyball player who plays for Toyota Auto Body Queenseis. She also plays for the All-Japan women's volleyball team.

Fujita played for the All-Japan team for the first time at the Montreux Volley Masters in May 2013.

Clubs
  Takasaki Junior High
  Furukawa Gakuen Highschool
  Toyota Auto Body Queenseis (2010-)

Awards

Individual
 2014 63rd Kurowashiki All Japan Volleyball Tournament Best6

Clubs
 2011 Empress's Cup -  Runner-Up, with Toyota Auto Body.
2014 63rd Kurowashiki All Japan Volleyball Tournament  Champion, with Toyota Auto body.

References

External links
 Toyota Auto Body Queenseis - Profile

Japanese women's volleyball players
Living people
1991 births
Sportspeople from Miyagi Prefecture